Jawornica  is a village located in the administrative district of Gmina Kochanowice, within Lubliniec County, Silesian Voivodeship, in southern Poland.

The village has a population of 535.

References

Jawornica